Prataprao Ganpatrao Jadhav (born 25 November 1960) is an Indian politician. He represents the Buldhana (Lok Sabha constituency)Buldhana constituency of Maharashtra state and is a member of the Shiv Sena (SS) political party. He defeated Dr. Rajendra Shingne of Nationalist Congress Party in the 15th Lok Sabha elections. Before becoming MP he has held various posts from Sarpanch to MLA. He was also the state minister in Sena BJP government. He is chairmen of sharngdhar sugar mills.he elected mp 3 times from buldhana lok Sabha constituency of Maharashtra.

Positions held
 1995-1999 : Member, Maharashtra Legislative Assembly (1st term)
 1997-1999 : State Minister for Sports, Youth Welfare & Irrigation, Govt. of Maharashtra
 1999-2004 : Member, Maharashtra Legislative Assembly (2nd term)
 2004-2009 : Member, Maharashtra Legislative Assembly (3rd term)
 2009 : Elected to 15th Lok Sabha (1st term)
 May, 2014 : Re-elected to 16th Lok Sabha (2nd term)
 2019 : Re-elected to 17th Lok Sabha (3rd term)

References

External links
 Shiv Sena official website 
 Fifteenth Lok Sabha Members Bioprofile - Jadhav, Shri Prataprao Ganpatrao

Living people
1960 births
Shiv Sena politicians
People from Maharashtra
People from Buldhana district
India MPs 2009–2014
Marathi politicians
Maharashtra MLAs 2004–2009
Lok Sabha members from Maharashtra
India MPs 2014–2019
India MPs 2019–present
Maharashtra MLAs 1995–1999